The Palacio de Torre Tagle is a building built during the colonial era of Peru that currently serves as the main headquarters of the Ministry of Foreign Affairs of Peru. It is located in the Jirón Ucayali in the historic center of Lima, two blocks southeast of the Plaza Mayor de Lima.

It comprises a built area of 1699 m². The materials used in the construction of the Palacio de Torre Tagle were brought from Spain, Panama and other Central American countries.

History

The mansion was built at the early-18th century and was completed in 1735 for José Bernardo de Tagle Bracho who, on November 26, 1730, King Philip V of Spain, by virtue of his extensive services to the Crown, granted the title of Marquis of Torre Tagle, thus making him the founder of that marquessate.

The Peruvian State acquired the colonial building on June 27, 1918 for the sum of S/. 320,000 to the heirs of Ricardo Ortiz de Zevallos y Tagle, 4th Marquis of Torre Tagle. It was restored in 1956 by the Spanish architect Andrés Boyer, it is currently, since 1918, the main headquarters of the Ministry of Foreign Affairs of Peru and the National Directorate of State Ceremonial and Protocol.

Description

Facade
The facade of the Palacio de Torre Tagle, is of Andalusian Baroque style and shows carved stone porticos and arches and two artistic Mudéjar wooden balconies, cedar and mahogany, wood carving. Regarding the architectural style of this house, the architect Héctor Velarde Bergmann specifies:

The exterior part presents a remarkable and asymmetrical façade, a characteristic that gives it agility and harmony, with a carved portal, in stone in the first body and in stucco in the second, in the most charming Liman Baroque, in whose upper part the noble coat of arms of the Torre Tagle family in which the legend reads:

means:

On its second floor, it is adorned with two typical balconies -the most beautiful from the colonial period- made of carved cedar and mahogany wood and of Mudéjar reminiscence, highlighting the asymmetry of the façade, since one, the one on the right, It has three sections and the one on the left seven, both are completely closed with blinds with slats, both balconies, which reflect the transition from the Andalusian Mudéjar style to the Hispanic-American Baroque, have corbels, or carved wooden supports, with Hindu-inspired motifs.

The windows in the lower part of the house are simple and with wrought iron bars whose austerity contrasts with the ornate style of the balconies. The impressive-sized wooden door, decorated with bronze nails and adorned with two full-size door knockers, opens into a zaguan, featuring four stone-carved segmental arches with a stone floor, in the zaguan to the right and left, there are small steps used by the ladies to get on their mounts without difficulty.

On the platforms that crown them, you can see that the stone pieces are joined by copper stars. Near this place a chain was placed that signified the right of Asylum, a privilege that the Palace of the Marquises of Torre Tagle had, and which some churches in Lima also enjoyed at that time. The walls of the zaguan are decorated with Sevillian azulejos and the ceiling is remarkably artesonado.

Interior
The zaguan leads to a first courtyard, with a spacious entrance, wide, bright and surrounded by elegant balustrades, arcades and Mudéjar-style columns, conceived as the vital center of the entire architectural complex that gravitates towards it. The style is mainly Andalusian Baroque with an obvious Mudéjar influence on the two floors surrounding the central courtyard. The upper floor is reached by a spacious and opulent staircase at the entrance of which is a notable stone doorway with trefoil arches that, like those on the upper floor, exhibit Andalusian Mudéjar influence.

On the ceiling of the staircase of the Palacio de Torre Tagle, the coat of arms of the Marquis can be seen, made up of three quarters in which a knight, a snake and a maiden can be distinguished, symbolizing the nickname: Tagle was called the one that the snake killed and with the infanta killed. The upper floor of this family home features elegant galleries with azulejos baseboards, guardrail with balusters and fine mosaic floors.

It has fourteen rooms, a dining room, a kitchen, a small chapel, with a fire-gilded Baroque altar, adorned with mirrors and elegant halls, the decorative and interesting azulejos (dating from 1735). One of the rooms, called the Salón Principal, shows the portraits of the Torre Tagle family, one of them shows Don José Bernardo de Tagle Bracho, the 1st Marquis of Torre Tagle who became, in conclusion, the architect of the palace, according to the inscription on the painting:

Another of the paintings shows his wife (she died in 1761). One of the palace's greatest attractions is its 18th-century blue and red carriage, which was used by the Marquis of Torre Tagle. The second courtyard was used for the stables, services and garages, with carriages of the time.

Gallery

Similar mansions 
List of buildings in Lima
Balconies of Lima

References

External links

Houses completed in 1735
Buildings and structures in Lima
Tourist attractions in Lima
Colonial Peru
Baroque palaces in Peru
Churrigueresque architecture in Peru
Mudéjar architecture
18th-century establishments in the Viceroyalty of Peru